Yambayevo (Yambay) is a rural locality (a selo) in Bayguzinsky Selsoviet, Yanaulsky District, Bashkortostan, Russia. The population was 124 as of 2010. There are 2 streets.

Geography 
Yambayevo is located 20 km southwest of Yanaul (the district's administrative centre) by road. Kumalak is the nearest rural locality.

References 

Rural localities in Yanaulsky District